Harold Watson may refer to:
Harold Watson (athlete) (1883–1963), British athlete
Harold Watson (cricketer, born 1888) (1888–1969), English cricketer
Harold Watson (cricketer, born 1893) (1893–1972), English cricketer and army officer
Harold Watson (footballer) (1908–1982), English footballer
Harold Watson (New Zealand cricketer) (1879–1958), New Zealand cricketer
Harold Ray Watson (born 1934), farm technology pioneer
Harry Watson (ice hockey, born 1923) (1923–2002), Canadian ice hockey player

See also
Harry Watson (disambiguation)